The Friedrichshafen FF.31 was a two-seat prototype German maritime reconnaissance floatplane built by Flugzeugbau Friedrichshafen during the First World War. Although primarily intended for reconnaissance duties, the aircraft was provided with a machine gun to engage other aircraft. Although it was satisfactory for its intended mission, it lacked the performance necessary for use as a fighter. A pair of aircraft were built in 1915 and it was not accepted for production by the Imperial German Navy's Naval Air Service.

Background and description
Developed from the prewar Friedrichshafen FF.27 maritime reconnaissance floatplane, the FF.31 was fitted with a machine gun for the observer who had an excellent field of fire from in his position in the front cockpit. The aircraft was intended to be able to intercept enemy aircraft, but its lack of speed and poor rate of climb made this difficult at best. Furthermore, by this time, the vulnerability of pusher-configuration aircraft to attacks from the rear had been realized. The first prototype flew on 12 April 1915, but its poor performance caused the Naval Air Service to reject it for service.

The FF.31 was a twin-boom biplane with a central nacelle with the  Maybach Mb.III straight-six engine mounted at its rear. Two open-frame booms extended aft from the wings to carry the tail structure. It was fitted with two open cockpits in the nacelle. The observer was armed with a  Parabellum MG14 machine gun on a flexible mount. The two forward floats were attached to the lower wing by four pairs of V-shaped struts while the third float was connected directly to the tail. To speed construction of the aircraft, the wings and floats from the Friedrichshafen FF.29 reconnaissance aircraft were used. A version of the FF.31 with conventional landing gear and a  Benz Bz.III engine was designated the FF.37.

Variants
FF.31: Two prototypes built.
FF.37: FF.31 with conventional landing gear and a Benz Bz.III engine.

Operators

German Imperial Navy

Specifications (FF.31)

See also

References

Bibliography

1910s German military reconnaissance aircraft
Single-engined pusher aircraft
Floatplanes
Biplanes
Twin-boom aircraft
FF.31
Aircraft first flown in 1915